Apollon was a  74-gun ship of the line of the French Navy.

Career 
In 1790, Apollon was the flagship of Charles Louis du Chilleau de La Roche, in Brest. 

Between 1791 and 1793, she was based in Saint-Domingue.

During the Siege of Toulon, her commanding officer, Captain Imbert, negotiated the surrender of the town with Admiral Hood aboard . After the siege, she ferried 1,500 anti-revolutionary prisoners to Rochefort, where most of them were executed.

She took part in the battle of the Glorious First of June, and the Croisière du Grand Hiver ("Campaign of the Great Winter") in 1794–1795.

She was eventually broken up in 1798.

Sources and references 
 Notes

References

 Bibliography
 

Ships of the line of the French Navy
Téméraire-class ships of the line
1788 ships